is a Japanese actor and voice actor from Fukuoka Prefecture, Japan.

He has been put into rehab after recovering from cerebral hemorrhage.

Filmography

Anime
Masaomi Oogami in Onmyou Taisenki
Amon in Witch Hunter Robin
Ogawara Ryouhei in Jinki:EXTEND
Kirihito in Get Backers
Okita Souji in Bakumatsu Kikansetsu Irohanihoheto
Raina Cromwell in Dragonaut -The Resonance-
Morita Kaoru in Honey and Clover
Observer in Kekkaishi
Kenji in Swallowtail Inn
Izumi Higa in Sekirei

Dubs

Live-action
Alpha Dog, Frankie "Nuts" Ballenbacher (Justin Timberlake)
Antwone Fisher, Antwone Fisher (Derek Luke)
The Assassination of Jesse James by the Coward Robert Ford, Charley Ford (Sam Rockwell)
Before the Devil Knows You're Dead, Hank Hanson (Ethan Hawke)
Bionic Woman, Will Anthros (Chris Bowers)
Black Hawk Down, Matt Eversmann (Josh Hartnett)
The Comebacks, Lance Truman (Matthew Lawrence)
The Darjeeling Limited, Jack (Jason Schwartzman)
The Departed, Colin Sullivan (Matt Damon)
Eight Below, Charlie Cooper (Jason Biggs)
Flags of Our Fathers, John Bradley (Ryan Phillippe)
The Fog, Nicholas Castle (Tom Welling)
Gossip Girl, Carter Baizen (Sebastian Stan)
He's Just Not That Into You, Ben (Bradley Cooper)
The Hole, Michael Steel (Desmond Harrington)
Just Married, Tom Leezak (Ashton Kutcher)
Ocean's trilogy, Linus Caldwell (Matt Damon)
On the Edge, Jonathan Breech (Cillian Murphy)
Pineapple Express, Saul Silver (James Franco)
The Princess Diaries 2: Royal Engagement, Nicholas Deveraux (Chris Pine)
REC, Pablo (Pablo Rosso)
Rocky Balboa, Robert Balboa, Jr. (Milo Ventimiglia)
Shutter, Benjamin Shaw (Joshua Jackson)
Snakes on a Plane, Sean Jones (Nathan Phillips)
Sunshine, James Mace (Chris Evans)
Torchwood, Captain Jack Harkness (John Barrowman)

Animation
Atlantis: Milo's Return, Milo

Drama CDs
Aka no Shinmon (Hibiki Renjou)

References

External links
 

1971 births
Living people
Japanese male stage actors
Japanese male video game actors
Japanese male voice actors
Male voice actors from Fukuoka Prefecture